Agenioideus is a genus of spider wasps from the subfamily Pompilinae; the genus occurs in Europe, where 21 species are recorded, eastwards to Japan, in North America, South America, and Australia.

Selected species
Agenioideus acconeus  (Banks, 1947)  
Agenioideus apicalis  (Vander Linden, 1827)
Agenioideus arenicolus  (Priesner, 1955)
Agenioideus biedermani  (Banks, 1910)
Agenioideus birkmanni  (Banks, 1910)
Agenioideus ciliatus  (Lepeletier, 1845)
Agenioideus cinctellus  (Spinola, 1808)
Agenioideus coronatus (Nouvel & Ribaut, 1958)
Agenioideus dichrous  (Brulle, 1840)
Agenioideus excisus  (Morawitz, 1890)
Agenioideus expulsus  Turner 1917
Agenioideus fascinubecula  Wolf, 1986
Agenioideus fertoni  (Saunders, 1901)
Agenioideus gentilis  (Klug, 1834)
Agenioideus humilis  (Cresson, 1867)
Agenioideus injudicatus  Junco y Reyes, 1960
Agenioideus ishikawai  Shimizu, 1989
Agenioideus kerkyrus  Wolf, 1985
Agenioideus kokya  Shimizu & Wahis, 2009
Agenioideus maculipes  (Smith, 1870)
Agenioideus minutus  (Banks, 1947)
Agenioideus nigricornis  (Fabricius), 1775
Agenioideus nubecula  (Costa, 1874)
Agenioideus poultoni  (Saunders, 1904)
Agenioideus rhodosoma  (Kohl, 1886)
Agenioideus ruficeps  (Eversmann, 1849)
Agenioideus rytiphorus  (Kohl, 1886)
Agenioideus seminiger  (Taschenberg, 1880)
Agenioideus sericeus  (Vander Linden, 1827)
Agenioideus tussaci  Wolf, 1986
Agenioideus usurarius  (Tournier, 1889)

References

Hymenoptera genera
Pompilinae